Willie Love Brooks (born October 8, 1986) is an American mixed martial artist who competes in the Lightweight division. A professional competitor since 2011, he is the former Bellator MMA Lightweight World Champion, and has also competed for DREAM, the Professional Fighters League and the UFC.

Background
Brooks grew up in Chicago projects in a broken home with his parents struggling with their demons. After getting kicked out of several schools due to fighting, he took up wrestling at Warren Township High School, but his main focus was playing football. Excelling in football during high school, he ended up going to college to play at Harper College, where he was an All-American in his first year. However, he let go of his dreams of playing in the NFL after sustaining a knee injury, which led to partying, substance abuse and eventually drug dealing. During his time in Harper, he met an old friend from high school in Nick Redding, who ended up changing the course of his life to MMA.

Mixed martial arts career

Early career
Brooks made his professional MMA debut in January 2011. He competed exclusively in his native Illinois and quickly amassed an undefeated record of 7-0 in the first two years of his career.

DREAM
In late 2012, Brooks received the biggest opportunity of his career as he was invited to Japan by the DREAM organization. He faced experienced veteran Satoru Kitaoka at Dream 18 on December 31, 2012. Despite being a heavy underdog, Brooks dominated the fight and won via TKO in the second round.

Bellator MMA
Following his impressive international debut, Brooks was quickly signed by Bellator Fighting Championships in January 2013.

Bellator Season 8 Lightweight Tournament
For his debut, Brooks was entered into the Bellator Lightweight Tournament. He faced Ricardo Tirloni in the opening round at Bellator 87 and won the fight via unanimous decision.

He faced Saad Awad in the semi-finals at Bellator 91 on February 28, 2013, and lost via KO in the first round.

Following the first loss of his career, Brooks rebounded with a win over Cris Leyva at Bellator 97 on July 31, 2013.

Bellator Season 9 Lightweight Tournament
In the fall of 2013, Brooks entered into the Bellator Season 9 Lightweight tournament. He faced veteran John Alessio in the Quarterfinals on September 27, 2013, at Bellator 101. He won the fight in dominant fashion via unanimous decision.

Brooks had a rematch with Saad Awad in the semifinal round at Bellator 105 on October 25, 2013, and dominated the fight for all three rounds, winning a unanimous decision victory.

Brooks faced Alexander Sarnavskiy in the finals at Bellator 109 on November 22, 2013. He won the fight via dominant unanimous decision to earn a future title shot at the Lightweight title.

Title shot and championship reign
On May 17, 2014, Brooks faced Michael Chandler filling in for the injured champ Eddie Alvarez at Bellator 120 for the Interim Bellator Lightweight Championship. He won via split decision to become the Interim Bellator Lightweight Champion.

With Bellator Lightweight Champion Eddie Alvarez leaving the promotion, Brooks faced Michael Chandler in a rematch at Bellator 131 on November 15, 2014, for the vacant Bellator Lightweight Championship. He won the fight via TKO in the fourth round to become the undisputed Bellator Lightweight Champion.

Brooks made his first title defense against long-awaited challenger Dave Jansen at Bellator 136 on April 10, 2015. He won the fight by unanimous decision.

Brooks made his second defense against Marcin Held on November 6, 2015, at Bellator 145. Despite Held popping Brooks' knee in the opening round, Brooks continued on and won the fight via unanimous decision to retain the Bellator Lightweight Championship.

On May 14, 2016, Brooks was released from Bellator MMA as the promotion decided not to renew his contract.

Ultimate Fighting Championship
On June 15, 2016, it was announced that Brooks had signed a six-fight deal with the UFC. He made his promotional debut against Ross Pearson on July 8, 2016, at The Ultimate Fighter 23 Finale. Brooks won the fight by unanimous decision.

Brooks next faced Alex Oliveira on October 1, 2016, at UFC Fight Night 96. The bout took place at a catchweight of 161.5 lbs, as Oliveira missed weight. Brooks lost the fight via KO in the third round.

Brooks faced Charles Oliveira on April 8, 2017, at UFC 210. He lost the fight by rear-naked choke submission in the first round.

Brooks was scheduled to face Nik Lentz on October 7, 2017, at UFC 216. However the pairing was scrapped during the weigh-ins for the event, as Lentz was stricken with "medical issues" and deemed unfit to compete. The pairing with Lentz was rescheduled and eventually took take place on November 19, 2017 at UFC Fight Night 121. Brooks lost the fight via submission in the second round.

On February 14, 2018, Brooks announced via social media that he had been officially released from the UFC after a 4 fight stint.

Professional Fighters League
Following his departure from the UFC, Brooks announced he had signed a deal with the Professional Fighters League and he would be entering the promotion's one million dollar tournament.

PFL season 2018
In his debut, Brooks faced Luiz Firmino at PFL 2 on June 21, 2018. He won the fight by unanimous decision.

In his second fight in the Lightweight tournament, Brooks faced Robert Watley on August 2, 2018, at PFL 5. He won the fight by unanimous decision and advanced to the playoffs.

In the quarterfinal bout Brooks faced Rashid Magomedov at PFL 9 on October 13, 2018. The bout ended in a unanimous draw, but Brooks was eliminated from the tournament via first-round tiebreaker.

In the end of January 2019, Brooks announced in social media that he became a free agent after the inaugural season of PFL.

Post-PFL career
Brooks was expected to face Abel Trujillo at Battlefield FC 2 on July 27, 2019, but Trujillo was withdrawn from the bout and was replaced by Brooks' teammate Gleison Tibau. He lost the fight via first-round submission.

On March 30, 2020, news surfaced that Brooks had signed a contract with ARES FC.

Brooks faced Steven Siler on July 30, 2021 at XMMA 2. He won the bout via unanimous decision.

Brooks faced Jose Filho at Art of Scrap 3 on October 30, 2021. He won the bout via rear-naked choke submission in the third round.

Brooks faced Rafael Bastos on April 15, 2022 at Art of Scrap 4. He won the fight via TKO due to injury after Bastos broke his leg early in the first round.

Brooks faced Luis Peña at XMMA 5 on July 23, 2022. He won the bout via split decision.

Personal life
Brooks and his wife have a daughter.

Championships and accomplishments
Bellator MMA
Bellator Lightweight Championship (One time; former)
Two successful title defenses
Interim Bellator Lightweight Championship (One time; former)
Bellator Season Nine Lightweight Tournament winner

Mixed martial arts record

|-
|Win
|align=center|24–5–1
|Luis Peña
|Decision (split)
|XMMA 5
|
|align=center|3
|align=center|5:00
|Columbia, South Carolina, United States
|
|-
| Win
| align=center|23–5–1
| Rafael Bastos
| TKO (leg injury)
| Art of Scrap 4
| 
| align=center|1
| align=center|0:19
| Fort Wayne, Indiana, United States
|
|-
| Win
| align=center|22–5–1
| Jose Filho
| Submission (rear-naked choke)
| Art of Scrap 3
| 
| align=center|3
| align=center|4:54
| Fort Wayne, Indiana, United States
| 
|-
|Win
|align=center|21–5–1
|Steven Siler
|Decision (unanimous)
|XMMA 2: Saunders vs. Nijem
|
|align=center|3
|align=center|5:00
|Greenville, South Carolina, United States
|  
|-
|Loss
|align=center|20–5–1
|Gleison Tibau
|Technical Submission (guillotine choke)
|Battlefield FC 2
|
|align=center|1
|align=center|3:34
|Macau, SAR, China
| 
|-
|Draw
|align=center|
|Rashid Magomedov
|Draw (unanimous)
| PFL 9
| 
| align=center| 2
| align=center| 5:00
| Long Beach, California, United States
|
|-
| Win
| align=center|20–4
| Robert Watley
| Decision (unanimous)
| PFL 5
| 
| align=center|3
| align=center|5:00
| Uniondale, New York, United States
|
|-
| Win
| align=center|19–4
| Luiz Firmino
| Decision (unanimous)
| PFL 2
| 
| align=center| 3
| align=center| 5:00
| Chicago, Illinois, United States
| 
|-
|Loss
|align=center|18–4
|Nik Lentz
|Submission (guillotine choke)
|UFC Fight Night: Werdum vs. Tybura
|
|align=center|2
|align=center|2:05
|Sydney, Australia
|
|-
|Loss
|align=center|18–3
|Charles Oliveira
|Submission (rear-naked choke)
|UFC 210
|
|align=center|1
|align=center|2:30
|Buffalo, New York, United States
|
|-
|Loss
|align=center|18–2
|Alex Oliveira
|KO (punches)
|UFC Fight Night: Lineker vs. Dodson
|
|align=center|3
|align=center|3:30
|Portland, Oregon, United States
|
|-
|Win
|align=center|18–1
|Ross Pearson
|Decision (unanimous)
|The Ultimate Fighter: Team Joanna vs. Team Cláudia Finale
|
|align=center|3
|align=center|5:00
|Las Vegas, Nevada, United States
|
|-
|Win
|align=center|17–1
|Marcin Held
|Decision (unanimous)
|Bellator 145
|
|align=center|5
|align=center|5:00
|St. Louis, Missouri, United States
|
|-
|Win
|align=center|16–1
|Dave Jansen
|Decision (unanimous)
|Bellator 136
|
|align=center|5
|align=center|5:00
|Irvine, California, United States
|
|-
|Win
|align=center|15–1
|Michael Chandler
|TKO (punches)
|Bellator 131
|
|align=center|4
|align=center|3:48
|San Diego, California, United States
|
|-
|Win
|align=center|14–1
|Michael Chandler
|Decision (split)
|Bellator 120
|
|align=center|5
|align=center|5:00
|Southaven, Mississippi, United States
|
|-
| Win
|align=center|13–1
| Alexander Sarnavskiy
| Decision (unanimous)
|Bellator 109
|
|align=center|3
|align=center|5:00
|Bethlehem, Pennsylvania, United States
|
|-
|Win
|align=center|12–1
|Saad Awad
|Decision (unanimous)
|Bellator 105
|
|align=center|3
|align=center|5:00
|Rio Rancho, New Mexico, United States
|
|-
|Win
|align=center|11–1
|John Alessio
|Decision (unanimous)
|Bellator 101
|
|align=center|3
|align=center|5:00
|Portland, Oregon, United States
|
|-
|Win
|align=center|10–1
|Cris Leyva
|TKO (punches)
|Bellator 97
|
|align=center|3
|align=center|2:20
|Rio Rancho, New Mexico, United States
|
|-
|Loss
|align=center|9–1
|Saad Awad
|KO (punches)
|Bellator 91
|
|align=center|1
|align=center|0:43
|Rio Rancho, New Mexico, United States
|
|-
|Win
|align=center|9–0
|Ricardo Tirloni
|Decision (unanimous)
|Bellator 87
|
|align=center|3
|align=center|5:00
|Mount Pleasant, Michigan, United States
|
|-
|Win
|align=center|8–0
|Satoru Kitaoka
|TKO (punches)
|DREAM 18
|
|align=center|2
|align=center|3:46
|Saitama, Japan
|
|-
|Win
|align=center|7–0
|Drew Dober
|Decision (unanimous)
|Disorderly Conduct: The Yin & The Yang
|
|align=center|3
|align=center|5:00
|Omaha, Nebraska, United States
|
|-
|Win
|align=center|6–0
|Tory Bogguess
|TKO (punches)
|XFO 44
|
|align=center|1
|align=center|4:20
|Hoffman Estates, Illinois, United States
|
|-
|Win
|align=center|5–0
|Ryan Bixler
|Submission (rear-naked choke)
|Chicago Cagefighting Championship IV
|
|align=center|2
|align=center|1:00
|Villa Park, Illinois, United States
|
|-
|Win
|align=center|4–0
|Joseph Richardson
|Submission (armbar)
|XFO 41
|
|align=center|1
|align=center|3:49
|Island Lake, Illinois, United States
|
|-
|Win
|align=center|3–0
|Bobby Reardanz
|Submission (armbar)
|XFO 39
|
|align=center|3
|align=center|3:22
||Hoffman Estates, Illinois, United States
|
|-
|Win
|align=center|2–0
|Guillermo Serment
|Submission (rear-naked choke)
|Chicago Cagefighting Championship III
|
|align=center|2
|align=center|0:45
|Villa Park, Illinois, United States
|
|-
|Win
|align=center|1–0
|J.R. Hines
|TKO (punches)
|XFO 38
|
|align=center|1
|align=center|2:09
|Woodstock, Illinois, United States
|

See also
 List of Bellator MMA alumni
 List of current mixed martial arts champions
 List of male mixed martial artists

References

External links
 
 

1986 births
Living people
African-American mixed martial artists
American male mixed martial artists
Lightweight mixed martial artists
Harper Hawks football players
People from Coconut Creek, Florida
Bellator MMA champions
Ultimate Fighting Championship male fighters
21st-century African-American sportspeople
20th-century African-American people
People from Gurnee, Illinois
Sportspeople from the Chicago metropolitan area
Mixed martial artists from Illinois